"Chingkhong Poireiton", also known as "Poileiton", is a prince of the Khamnung (underworld kingdom) and a younger brother of Thongaren, the god of death in Meitei mythology and religion. He is best known as a cultural hero, for leading a colonial immigration to the human world (Kangleipak kingdom), as per the wish of his brother.
He is mentioned in the Poireiton Khunthok, an ancient book about his immigration to the human kingdom.

Related pages
 Khuman kingdom
 Ancient Kangleipak

Bibliography
 Poireiton Khunthok : Chandra Singh, Moirangthem : Free Download, Borrow, and Streaming : Internet Archive
 Poiraiton khunthok (Book, 1979) WorldCat.org

References

Meitei folklore
Meitei deities
Meitei literature
Underworld gods
Kings of Ancient Manipur